Love Tracks is the ninth studio album by American singer-songwriter Don McLean, released by Capitol in 1988.

Two singles were released from the album. You Can't Blame the Train reached No. 49 on the US Billboard Hot Country Songs in December 1987, while "Love in My Heart" reached No. 65 in August 1988.

Critical reception

Upon release, Cash Box commented: "The man who was the great hope of folk music a decade and a half ago is back but not nearly as eye-opening. Now he's a bit countrified and more than a little corny; but at least he's got Duane Eddy guesting on guitar." Billboard stated: "Missing here are the profound and vivid lyrics that have long been McLean trademarks. Still, the song are melodic and listenable." In a retrospective review, Jim Esch of AllMusic described the album as "overly slick and dated '80s Nashville production" that "mars this comeback effort by Don McLean". He added: "The obvious intent was to pitch McLean at the mainstream country market, and while he does a credible enough job, McLean's real strength was always his sensitive songwriting."

Track listing

References

Don McLean albums
1988 albums
Capitol Records albums